Jahangirpur may refer to:

 Jahangirpur, Kapurthala, Punjab, India
 Jahangirpur, Uttar Pradesh,  Uttar Pradesh, India
 Jahangirpur Govt. College, Bangladesh
 Jangipur, Murshidabad, West Bengal, India

See also
 Jangipur (disambiguation)